Dorr Township may refer to the following places in the United States:

 Dorr Township, McHenry County, Illinois
 Dorr Township, Michigan

Township name disambiguation pages